Sri Sri Nilakantheswar Temple is a Hindu temple located in the neighbourhood of Bhimatangi, in western Bhubaneswar, India. The temple faces west, and its enshrining deity is a Shiva lingam within a circular yoni made of laterite.

See also
List of temples in Bhubaneswar

References

20th-century Hindu temples
Hindu temples in Bhubaneswar
20th-century architecture in India